Prince Felix Felixovich Yusupov, Count Sumarokov-Elston (– 27 September 1967) was a Russian aristocrat from the Yusupov family who is best known for participating in the assassination of Grigori Rasputin and for marrying Princess Irina Alexandrovna, a niece of Tsar Nicholas II.

Early life
He was born in the Moika Palace in Saint Petersburg, the capital of the Russian Empire. His father was Count Felix Felixovich Sumarokov-Elston, the son of Count Felix Nikolaievich Sumarokov-Elston. Zinaida Yusupova, his mother, was the last of the Yusupov line, of Tatar origin, and very wealthy. For the Yusupov name not to die out, his father (1856, Saint Petersburg – 1928, Rome, Italy) was granted the title and the surname of his wife, Princess Zinaida Yusupova, on 11 June 1885, a year after their marriage, but effective after the death of his father-in-law in 1891.

The Yusupov family, one of the richest families in Imperial Russia, had acquired their wealth generations earlier. It included four palaces in Saint Petersburg, three palaces in Moscow, 37 estates in different parts of Russia, on the Crimea (at Koreiz, Kökköz and Balaklava), coal and iron-ore mines, plants and factories, flour mills and oil fields on the Caspian Sea. His father served between 1886 and 1904 as an adjutant to Grand Duke Sergei Alexandrovich was appointed General-Governor of Moscow (with the support of Grand Duke Nikolas Nikolaevich).

Felix led a flamboyant life. As a young man, he cross-dressed, wearing ball gowns and his mother's jewelry to public events. From 1909 to 1913, he studied Forestry and later English at University College, Oxford, where he was a member of the Bullingdon Club, and established the Oxford Russian Club. Yusupov was living on 14 King Edward Street, had a Russian cook, a French driver, an English valet, and a housekeeper, and spent much of his time partying. He owned three horses, a macaw, and a bulldog called Punch. He smoked hashish, danced tango and became friendly with Luigi Franchetti, a piano player, and Jacques de Beistegui, who both moved in. At some time, Yusupov became acquainted with Albert Stopford and Oswald Rayner, a classmate. He rented an apartment in Curzon Street, Mayfair, and met several times with the ballerina Anna Pavlova, who lived in Hampstead.

Marriage

The engagement took place in the fall of 1913 in the Yusupov Palace in Koreiz. Back in Saint Petersburg, he married Princess Irina of Russia, the Tsar's only niece, in the Anichkov Palace on 22 February 1914. The bride was wearing a veil that had belonged to Marie Antoinette. The Yusupovs went on honeymoon to the Crimea, Italy, Egypt, Jerusalem, London, and Bad Kissingen in Germany, where his parents were staying. No one suspected this would be the last grand wedding in the Russian Empire.

World War I
When World War I broke out in August 1914, both were briefly detained in Berlin. Irina asked her relative, Crown Princess Cecilie of Prussia, to intervene with Kaiser Wilhelm II. The Kaiser refused to permit the Yusupov family to leave but offered them a choice of three country estates to live in for the duration of the war. Felix's father appealed to the Spanish ambassador in Germany and won permission for them to return to Russia via neutral Denmark to the Grand Duchy of Finland and from there to Saint Petersburg. 

The Yusupovs' only daughter, Princess Irina Felixovna Yusupova, nicknamed Bébé, was born on 21 March 1915. She was largely raised by her paternal grandparents until she was nine. She was very spoiled by them. Her unstable upbringing caused her to become "capricious", according to Felix. Felix and Irina, raised mainly by nannies themselves, were ill-suited to take on the day-to-day burdens of child-rearing. Bébé adored her father but had a more distant relationship with her mother.

After the death of his brother, Felix was the heir to an immense fortune. Consulting with family members about how best to administer the money and property, he decided to devote time and money to charitable works to help the poor. The losses at the Eastern Front were enormous, and so Felix converted a wing/floor of the Liteyny House into a hospital for wounded soldiers.

Career

Felix was able to avoid entering military service himself by taking advantage of a law exempting only-sons from serving. Irina's first cousin, Grand Duchess Olga, to whom she had been close when they were children, was disdainful of Felix: "Felix is a 'downright civilian,' dressed all in brown, walked to and fro about the room, searching in some bookcases with magazines and virtually doing nothing; an utterly unpleasant impression he makes – a man idling in such times," Olga wrote to Nicholas on 5 March 1915 after paying a visit to the Yusupovs.

"Yusupov's plan, as he described it in his book, was to seek closer acquaintance with the healer Grigori Rasputin, and win his confidence. He asked Rasputin to cure a slight malady from which he suffered." These sessions stopped early January 1915 when, according to Maurice Paléologue, the most absurd stories were spread about Alexandra Feodorovna, Rasputin was accused of selling out to Germany, and the tsarina was called nothing but "German" (in first place her birth nationality). The men did not meet for almost two years. In February 1916 Felix began studies at the elite Page Corps military academy and tried joining a regiment in August.

The Memoirs by M. Paléologue 
The incessant retreat in Galicia and the rumours of heavy losses gave rise to a lot of swearing and gossip, according to Alexander Spiridovich.

On 19 June 1915, after anti-German pogroms in Moscow, which he could not quickly stop, he was dismissed from the post of chief of the Moscow Military District, and on September 3, 1915 — from the post of commander-in-chief over Moscow.

Killing of Rasputin
Early November 1916, Felix Yusupov approached the lawyer Vasily Maklakov, who agreed to advise Felix. It seems Yusopov then asked Sergei Mikhailovich Sukhotin, an army officer in the Preobrazhensky Regiment who was recovering from injuries and a friend of his mother. Grand Duke Dmitri received Yusupov's suggestion with alacrity, and his alliance was welcomed as indicating that the murder would not be a demonstration against the [Romanov] dynasty. On 20 November Felix visited Vladimir Purishkevich, who had delivered an angry anti-Rasputin speech in the Duma on the day before, and quickly agreed to participate in the murder.

On the night of 29/30 December (NS) 1916, Felix, Dmitri, Vladimir Purishkevich, assistant Stanislas de Lazovert, and Sukhotin killed Rasputin in the Moika Palace under the pretense of a housewarming party. A major reconstruction of the palace had almost been finished, with a small room in the basement carefully furnished. Perhaps some women were invited but Yusupov did not mention their names; Radzinsky suggested Dimitri's step-sister Marianne Pistohlkors and film star Vera Karalli. Smith came up with Princess Olga Paley and Anna von Drenteln. Somewhere in the building were a major-domo and a valet, waiting for orders.

According to both Yusupov and Purishkevich, a gramophone in the study played interminably the Yankee Doodle when Rasputin came in. Yusupov mentions in his unreliable memoirs, he then offered Rasputin  tea and petit fours laced with a large amount of potassium cyanide.  According to the diplomat, Maurice Paléologue—who in later years rewrote his diary—they discussed spirituality and occultism; the antique dealer Albert Stopford wrote that politics was the issue. After an hour or so, Rasputin was fairly drunk. Still waiting for Rasputin to collapse, Yusupov became anxious that Rasputin might live until the morning, leaving the conspirators no time to conceal his body. Yusupov went upstairs  and came back with a revolver.

Rasputin was hit at close range by a bullet that entered his left chest and penetrated the stomach and the liver. The wounds were serious, and Rasputin would have died in 10–20 min, but he succeeded in escaping outside. A second bullet from a distance with a firearm lodged into his spine after penetrating the right kidney. Rasputin fell in the snow-clad courtyard and his body was taken inside. It is not clear whether or not Yusupov beat Rasputin with a sort of dumb bell. It is also not clear if it was Purishkevich who shot him point-blank into the forehead. A curious policeman on duty on the other side of the Moika had heard the shots, rang at the door, and was sent away. Half an hour later, another policeman arrived, and Purishkevich invited him into the palace. Purishkevich told him that he had shot Rasputin and asked him to keep it quiet for the sake of the Tsar. The conspirators finally threw the corpse from Bolshoy Petrovsky Bridge into an ice hole in the Malaya Neva.

On the Empress's orders, a police investigation commenced and traces of blood were discovered on the steps to the back door of the Yusupov Palace. Prince Felix attempted to explain the blood with a story that one of his favourite dogs was shot accidentally by Grand Duke Dmitri. Yusupov and Dmitri were placed under house arrest in the Sergei Palace. (The upper levels of the palace were occupied by the British embassy and the Anglo-Russian Hospital.)

The Empress had refused to meet the two but said that they could explain what had happened in a letter to her. She wanted both shot immediately, but she was persuaded to back off from the idea. Without a trial, the Tsar sent Dmitri to the front in Persia; Purishkevich was already on his way to the front in Romania. The Tsar banished Yusupov to his estate in Rakitnoye, Belgorod Oblast.
Yusupov published several accounts of the night and the events surrounding the murder. Recent authorities have cast doubt on Yusupov's account (see Grigori Rasputin).

According to Maklakov, Yusupov was not the mastermind. Fuhrmann thinks that Yusupov was the man who hatched the plot and who carried it out. "The clumsy way the assassination was carried out shows it was the work of an amateur." Fuhrmann also thinks Yusupov's "...candid Memoirs were corroborated by the other conspirators."

Exile

One week after the February Revolution, Nicholas abdicated the throne on 2 March. Following the abdication, the Yusupovs returned to the Moika Palace before they went to Crimea. They later returned to the palace to retrieve jewels (including the blue Sultan of Morocco Diamond, the Polar Star Diamond, and the Marie Antoinette Diamond Earrings) and two paintings by Rembrandt, the sale proceeds of the paintings helped sustain the family in exile. The paintings were bought by Joseph E. Widener in 1921 and are now in the National Gallery in Washington, DC.

In Crimea, the family boarded a British warship, HMS Marlborough, which took them from Yalta to Malta. On the ship, Felix enjoyed boasting about the murder of Rasputin. One of the British officers noted that Irina "appeared shy and retiring at first, but it was only necessary to take a little notice of her pretty, small daughter to break through her reserve and discover that she was also very charming and spoke fluent English."

From Malta, they travelled to Italy and then to Paris. In Italy, lacking a visa, he bribed the officials with diamonds. In Paris, they stayed a few days in the Hôtel de Vendôme before they went on to London. In 1920, they returned to Paris.

The Yusupovs lived in the following places in France:
 1920–1939: 37, Rue Gutenberg then 19 rue de La Tourelle in Boulogne-sur-Seine
 1939–1940: they rented a mansion in rue Victor-Hugo, Sarcelles
 1940–1943: they moved to rue Agar and 65 rue La Fontaine (16th arrondissement of Paris)
 from 1943 until their deaths: 38 rue Pierre-Guérin (Auteuil)

The Yusupovs founded a short-lived couture house, IRFĒ, named after the first two letters of their first names. 

Irina modeled some of the dresses the pair and other designers at the firm created. Yusupov became renowned in the Russian émigré community for his financial generosity. Their philanthropy and their continued high living and poor financial management extinguished what remained of the family fortune. Felix's bad business sense and the Wall Street crash of 1929 eventually forced the company to shut down. (A new business under the same name was started by others in Paris in 2008.)

Lawsuits

In 1932, he and his wife successfully sued American film company MGM, in the English courts, for libel and invasion of privacy in connection with the film Rasputin and the Empress. The alleged libel was not that the character based on Felix had committed murder but that the character based on Irina, called "Princess Natasha" in the film, was portrayed as having been seduced by the lecherous Rasputin. In 1934, the Yusupovs were awarded £25,000 damages, an enormous sum at the time, which was attributed to the successful arguments of their barrister, Patrick Hastings. The disclaimer that now appears at the end of many American films, "The preceding was a work of fiction, any similarity to a living person ...", first appeared as a result of the legal precedent set by the Yusupov case.

In 1965, Felix Yusupov also sued CBS in a New York court for televising a play based upon the Rasputin assassination. The claim was that some events were fictionalized, and under a New York state statute, his commercial rights in his story had been misappropriated. The last reported judicial opinion in the case was a ruling by New York's second-highest court that the case could not be resolved upon briefs and affidavits but must go to trial. According to an obituary of CBS's lawyer, Carleton G. Eldridge Jr., CBS eventually won the case.

In 1928, after Yusupov published his memoir detailing the killing of Rasputin, Rasputin's daughter, Maria, sued Yusupov and Dmitri in a Paris court for damages of $800,000. She condemned both men as murderers and said any decent person would be disgusted by the ferocity of Rasputin's killing. Maria's claim was dismissed. The French court ruled that it had no jurisdiction over a political killing that had occurred in Russia.

Death
Irina and Felix were married for more than 50 years. When Felix died in 1967, Irina was stricken by grief and she died three years later, on 26 February 1970. He was buried in Sainte-Geneviève-des-Bois Russian Cemetery, in the southern suburbs of Paris. Yusupov's private papers and a number of family artifacts and paintings are now owned by Victor Contreras, a Mexican sculptor who, as a young art student in the 1960s, met Yusupov and lived with the family for five years in Paris.

Some of the Yusupov possessions owned by Contreras were auctioned in November 2016 by Coutau Bégarie. This included correspondence with the family of his father's mistress, Zénaïde Gregorieff-Svetiloff.

Ancestors

Descendants

Descendants of Felix and Irina are:
Princess Irina Felixovna Yusupova, (21 March 1915, Saint Petersburg, Russia – 30 August 1983, Cormeilles-en-Parisis, France), married Count Nikolai Dmitrievich Sheremetev (28 October 1904, Moscow, Russia – 5 February 1979, Paris, France), son of Count Dmitry Sergeevich Sheremetev and wife Countess Irina Ilarionovna Vorontzova-Dachkova and a descendant of Boris Petrovich Sheremetev; had issue:
Countess Xenia Nikolaevna Sheremeteva (born 1 March 1942, Rome, Italy), married on 20 June 1965 in Athens, Greece, to Ilias Sfiris (born 20 August 1932, Athens, Greece); had issue:
Tatiana Sfiris (born 28 August 1968, Athens, Greece), married in May 1996 in Athens to Alexis Giannakoupoulos (born 1963), divorced, no issue; married Anthony Vamvakidis and has issue:
Marilia Vamvakidis (born 7 July 2004)
Yasmine Xenia Vamvakidis (born 17 May 2006)

Works

Bibliography

Notes

References

Sources

 
 Greg King (1994) The Last Empress. The Life & Times of Alexandra Feodorovna, tsarina of Russia. A Birch Lane Press Book.
 Margarita Nelipa (2010) The Murder of Grigorii Rasputin. A Conspiracy That Brought Down the Russian Empire, Gilbert's Books. .
 Bernard Pares (1939) The Fall of the Russian Monarchy. A Study of the Evidence. Jonathan Cape. London.
 Vladimir Pourichkevitch (1924) Comment j'ai tué Raspoutine. Pages de Journal. J. Povolozky & Cie. Paris

External links

The Yusupovs' Palace on Moika, Saint Petersburg – Family nest until 1919
Lost Splendour – Yusupov's self-biography until 1919 (online). Printed in 1952, .

 Читать онлайн "The Last Tsar: Emperor Michael II" автора Crawford Donald - RuLIT.Net - Страница 26

1887 births
1967 deaths
20th-century Russian criminals
Alumni of University College, Oxford
Burials at Sainte-Geneviève-des-Bois Russian Cemetery
Morganatic spouses of Russian royalty
Criminals from Saint Petersburg
Russian murderers
Russian princes
Russian monarchists
Russian people of Crimean Tatar descent
Felix
White Russian emigrants to the United Kingdom
White Russian emigrants to France
Emigrants from the Russian Empire to the United Kingdom
LGBT royalty
Bullingdon Club members
Nobility from Saint Petersburg